Gordon Robertson may refer to:

Gordon P. Robertson (born 1958), co-host on The 700 Club
Gordon Robertson (cricketer) (1909-1983), New Zealand cricketer
Gordon Robertson (ice hockey) (born 1926), Canadian ice hockey player

See also
Robert Gordon Robertson (1917–2013), Commissioner of the Northwest Territories
Gordon Robertson Cameron (1921–2010), businessman and former political figure in the Yukon, Canada